

Events

January–February

 January 14 – The Prime Minister of Northern Ireland and the Taoiseach of the Republic of Ireland meet for the first time in 43 years.
 January 20 
 Lyndon B. Johnson is sworn in for a full term as President of the United States.
 Indonesian President Sukarno announces the withdrawal of the Indonesian government from the United Nations.
 January 30 – The state funeral of Sir Winston Churchill takes place in London with the largest assembly of dignitaries in the world until the 2005 funeral of Pope John Paul II.
 February 4 – Trofim Lysenko is removed from his post as director of the Institute of Genetics at the Academy of Sciences in the Soviet Union. Lysenkoist theories are now treated as pseudoscience.
 February 12 
 The African and Malagasy Common Organization (OCAM) is formed as successor to the Afro-Malagasy Union for Economic Cooperation (UAMCE), formerly the African and Malagasy Union (UAM).
 February 18 – The Gambia becomes independent from the United Kingdom.
 February 20
 Ranger 8 crashes into the Moon, after a successful mission of photographing possible landing sites for the Apollo program astronauts.
 Suat Hayri Ürgüplü forms the new (interim) government of Turkey (29th government).

 February 21 – Malcolm X is gunned down while giving a speech at the Audubon Ballroom in Harlem.

March–April

 March 2 – Vietnam War: Operation Rolling Thunder – The United States Air Force 2nd Air Division, United States Navy and South Vietnamese air force begin a 3-year aerial bombardment campaign against North Vietnam.
 March 7 – "Bloody Sunday": Some 200 Alabama State Troopers attack 525 civil rights demonstrators in Selma, Alabama, as they attempt to march to the state capitol of Montgomery.
 March 8 – Vietnam War: Some 3,500 United States Marines arrive in Da Nang, South Vietnam, becoming the first American ground combat troops in Vietnam.
 March 9 – The "Turnaround Tuesday" march from Selma to Montgomery, Alabama, under the leadership of Martin Luther King Jr., stops at the site of "Bloody Sunday", to hold a prayer service and return to Selma, in obedience to a court restraining order. On the same day, White supremacists attack three white ministers, leaving Unitarian Universalist minister James J. Reeb in a coma.
 March 10 – An engagement is announced between Princess Margriet of the Netherlands and Pieter van Vollenhoven, who will become the first commoner and the first Dutchman to marry into the Dutch Royal Family.
 March 18 – Cosmonaut Alexei Leonov leaves his Voskhod 2 spacecraft for 12 minutes, becoming the first person to walk in space.
 March 20
 "Poupée de cire, poupée de son", sung by France Gall (music and lyrics by Serge Gainsbourg) wins the Eurovision Song Contest 1965 for Luxembourg.
 The Indo-Pakistani War of 1965 begins.
 March 23
 Events of March 23, 1965: Large student demonstration in Morocco, joined by discontented masses, meets with violent police and military repression. 
 Gemini 3: NASA launches the United States' first 2-person crew (Gus Grissom, John Young) into Earth orbit.
The first issue of The Vigilant is published from Khartoum.
 March 25 – Martin Luther King Jr. and 25,000 civil rights activists successfully end the 4-day march from Selma, Alabama, to the capitol in Montgomery.
March 28
At least 400 are killed or missing after an earthquake triggered a series of dam failures in La Ligua, Chile.
 March 30 – The second ODECA charter, signed by Central American states on December 12, 1962, becomes effective.
 April 3 – The world's first space nuclear power reactor, SNAP-10A, is launched by the United States from Vandenberg AFB, California. The reactor operates for 43 days and remains in low Earth orbit.
 April 5 – At the 37th Academy Awards, My Fair Lady wins 8 Academy Awards, including Best Picture and Best Director. Rex Harrison wins an Oscar for Best Actor. Mary Poppins takes home 5 Oscars. Julie Andrews wins an Academy Award for Best Actress for her performance in the title role. Sherman Brothers receives 2 Oscars including Best Song, "Chim Chim Cher-ee".
 April 6 – The Intelsat I ("Early Bird") communications satellite is launched. It becomes operational May 2 and is placed in commercial service in June.
 April 9 – The West German parliament extends the statute of limitations on Nazi war crimes.
 April 18 – Consecration of Saint Clement of Ohrid Macedonian Orthodox Cathedral in Toronto, Canada.
 April 23 – The Pennine Way officially opens.
 April 24
 The 1965 Yerevan demonstrations start in Yerevan, demanding recognition of the Armenian genocide.
 The bodies of Portuguese opposition politician Humberto Delgado and his secretary Arajaryr Moreira de Campos are found in a forest near Villanueva del Fresno, Spain (they were killed February 12).
 In the Dominican Republic, officers and civilians loyal to deposed President Juan Bosch mutiny against the right-wing junta running the country, setting up a provisional government. Forces loyal to the deposed military-imposed government stage a countercoup the next day, and civil war breaks out, although the new government retains its hold on power.
 April 26 – Rede Globo is founded in Rio de Janeiro, Brazil.
 April 28
 U.S. troops occupy the Dominican Republic.
 Vietnam War: Prime Minister of Australia Robert Menzies announces that the country will substantially increase its number of troops in South Vietnam, supposedly at the request of the Saigon government (it is later revealed that Menzies had asked the leadership in Saigon to send the request at the behest of the Americans).
 April 29 – Australia announces that it is sending an infantry battalion to support the South Vietnam government.

May–June

 May 1
 Bob Askin replaces Jack Renshaw as Premier of New South Wales.
 The Battle of Dong-Yin occurs as a conflict between Taiwan and the People's Republic of China.
 May 9 – Pianist Vladimir Horowitz returns to the stage after a 12-year absence, performing a legendary concert in Carnegie Hall in New York.
 May 12 –West Germany and Israel establish diplomatic relations.
 May 25 – Muhammad Ali knocks out Sonny Liston in the first round of their championship rematch with the "Phantom Punch" at the Central Maine Civic Center in Lewiston.
 May 27 – Internazionale beats Benfica 1–0 at the San Siro, Milan and wins the 1964-65 European Cup in Association football.
 May 29 – A mining accident in Dhanbad, India kills 274.
 May 31 – Scottish racing driver Jim Clark wins the Indianapolis 500, later this year winning the Formula One world driving championship.
 June 1 – A coal mine explosion in Fukuoka, Japan, kills 237.
 June 2 – Vietnam War: The first contingent of Australian combat troops arrives in South Vietnam.
 June 7 – Kakanj mine disaster: A mining accident in Kakanj, Bosnia and Herzegovina, results in 128 deaths.
 June 10 – Vietnam War – Battle of Dong Xoai: About 1,500 Viet Cong mount a mortar attack on Đồng Xoài, overrunning its military headquarters and the adjoining militia compound.
 June 19 
 Houari Boumediene's Revolutionary Council ousts Ahmed Ben Bella, in a bloodless coup in Algeria.
 Air Marshal Nguyen Cao Ky, head of the South Vietnamese Air Force, was appointed prime minister at the head of the military junta, with General Nguyễn Văn Thiệu becoming a figurehead president, ending two years of short-lived military juntas.
 June 20 – Police in Algiers break up demonstrations by people who have taken to the streets chanting slogans in support of deposed President Ahmed Ben Bella.
 June 22 – The Treaty on Basic Relations between Japan and the Republic of Korea is signed in Tokyo.
 June 25 – A U.S. Air Force Boeing C-135 Stratolifter bound for Okinawa crashes just after takeoff at MCAS El Toro in Orange County, California, killing all 85 on board.

July–August

 July – The Commonwealth secretariat is created.
 July 14 – U.S. spacecraft Mariner 4 flies by Mars, becoming the first spacecraft to return images from the Red Planet.
 July 15 – Greek Prime minister Georgios Papandreou and his government are dismissed by King Constantine II.
 July 16 – The Mont Blanc Tunnel is inaugurated by presidents Giuseppe Saragat and Charles de Gaulle.
 July 24 – Vietnam War: Four F-4C Phantoms escorting a bombing raid at Kang Chi are targeted by antiaircraft missiles, in the first such attack against American planes in the war. One is shot down and the other 3 sustain damage.
 July 26 – The Maldives receive full independence from Great Britain.
 July 27 – Edward Heath becomes Leader of the British Conservative Party.
 July 28 – Vietnam War: U.S. President Lyndon B. Johnson announces his order to increase the number of United States troops in South Vietnam from 75,000 to 125,000, and to more than double the number of men drafted per month - from 17,000 to 35,000.
 July 30 – War on Poverty: U.S. President Lyndon B. Johnson signs the Social Security Act of 1965 into law, establishing Medicare and Medicaid.
 August 7 – Tunku Abdul Rahman, Prime Minister of Malaysia, recommends the expulsion of Singapore from the Federation of Malaysia following a deterioration of PAP–UMNO relations, negotiating its separation with Lee Kuan Yew, Prime Minister of Singapore.
 August 9
 Singapore is expelled from the Federation of Malaysia, which recognises it as a sovereign nation. Lee Kuan Yew announces Singapore's independence and assumes the position of Prime Minister of the new island nation – a position he holds until 1990.
 An explosion at an Arkansas missile plant kills 53.
 Indonesian president Sukarno collapses in public.
 August 18 – Vietnam War: Operation Starlite – 5,500 United States Marines destroy a Viet Cong stronghold on the Van Tuong peninsula in Quảng Ngãi Province, in the first major American ground battle of the war. The Marines were tipped off by a Viet Cong deserter who said that there was an attack planned against the U.S. base at Chu Lai.
 August 19 – At the conclusion of the Frankfurt Auschwitz trials, 66 ex-SS personnel receive life sentences, 15 others shorter ones.
 August 21 – NASA launches Gemini 5 (Gordon Cooper, Pete Conrad) on the first 1-week space flight, as well as the first test of fuel cells for electrical power on such a mission.
 August 30 – An avalanche buries a dam construction site at Saas-Fee, Switzerland, killing 90 workers.
 August 31 – U.S. President Johnson signs a law penalizing the burning of draft cards with up to 5 years in prison and a $1,000 fine.

September–October

 September 2
Pakistani troops enter the Indian sector of Kashmir, while Indian troops try to invade Lahore.
 The People's Republic of China announces that it will reinforce its troops on the Indian border.
 September 8
 India opens 2 additional fronts against Pakistan.
 The Pakistan Navy destroys Indian Port of Dwarka. Operation Dwarka (Pakistan celebrates Victory Day annually).
 September 9
 U.N. Secretary General U Thant negotiates with Pakistan President Ayub Khan.
 U Thant recommends China for United Nations membership.
 September 14 – The fourth and final period of the Second Vatican Council opens.
 September 16 – In Iraq, Prime Minister Arif Abd ar-Razzaq's attempted coup fails.
 September 17 – King Constantine II of Greece forms a new government with Prime Minister Stephanos Stephanopoulos, in an attempt to end a 2-year-old political crisis.
 September 18
 In Denmark, Palle Sørensen shoots 4 policemen in pursuit; he is apprehended the same day.
 Comet Ikeya–Seki is first sighted by Japanese astronomers.
 Soviet Premier Alexei Kosygin invites the leaders of India and Pakistan to meet in the Soviet Union to negotiate.
 September 19
 Pakistani Forces achieve a decisive victory at the Battle of Chawinda, ultimately halting the Indian advance and successfully stabilizing the Sialkot Front.
 September 20 – Vietnam War: An USAF F-104 Starfighter piloted by Captain Philip Eldon Smith is shot down by a Chinese MiG-19 Farmer. The pilot is held until March 15 1973.
 September 21 – Gambia, Maldives and Singapore are admitted as members of the United Nations.
 September 22 – Radio Peking announces that Indian troops have dismantled their equipment on the Chinese side of the border.
 September 24
 Fighting resumes between Indian and Pakistani troops.
 The British governor of Aden cancels the constitution and takes direct control of the protectorate, due to the bad security situation.
 September 27 – The largest tanker ship at this time, Tokyo Maru, is launched in Yokohama, Japan.
 September 28
 Fidel Castro announces that anyone who wants to can emigrate to the United States.
 Taal Volcano in Luzon, Philippines, erupts, killing hundreds.
 September 30
 The Indonesian army, led by General Suharto, crushes an alleged communist coup attempt (see Transition to the New Order and 30 September Movement).
 The classic family sci-fi show Thunderbirds debuts on ITV in the United Kingdom.
 October 3 – Fidel Castro announces that Che Guevara has resigned and left Cuba.
 October 4
 At least 150 are killed when a commuter train derails at the outskirts of Durban, KwaZulu-Natal, South Africa.
 Prime minister Ian Smith of Rhodesia and Arthur Bottomley of the Commonwealth of Nations begin negotiations in London.
 Pope Paul VI visits the United States. He appears for a Mass in Yankee Stadium and makes a speech at the United Nations.
 The University of California, Irvine opens its doors.
 October 5 – Pakistan severs diplomatic relations with Malaysia because of their disagreement in the UN.
 October 6 – Ian Brady, a 27-year-old stock clerk from Hyde in Cheshire, is arrested for allegedly hacking to death (with a hatchet) 17-year-old apprentice electrician Edward Evans at a house on the Hattersley housing estate.
 October 7 – Seven Japanese fishing boats are sunk off Guam by super typhoon Carmen; 209 are killed.
 October 8
 Indonesian mass killings of 1965–1966: The Indonesian army instigates the arrest and execution of communists which last until next March.
 The 7 Fundamental Principles of the Red Cross and Red Crescent are adopted at the XX International Conference in Vienna, Austria.
 The International Olympic Committee admits East Germany as a member.
 October 10 – The first group of Cuban refugees travels to the U.S.
 October 12
 Per Borten forms a government in Norway.
 The U.N. General Council recommends that the United Kingdom try everything to stop a rebellion in Rhodesia.
 October 13 – Congo President Joseph Kasavubu fires Prime Minister Moise Tshombe and forms a provisional government, with Évariste Kimba in a leading position.
 October 15 – Vietnam War: The Catholic Worker Movement stages an anti-war protest in Manhattan. One draft card burner is arrested, the first under the new law.
 October 17 – The New York World's Fair at Flushing Meadows, closes. Due to financial losses, some of the projected site park improvements fail to materialize.
 October 18 – The Indonesian government outlaws the Communist Party of Indonesia.
 October 20 – Ludwig Erhard is re-elected Chancellor of West Germany (he had first been elected in 1963).
 October 21
 Comet Ikeya–Seki approaches perihelion, passing  from the sun.
 The Organization of African Unity meets in Accra, Ghana.
 October 22
 African countries demand that the United Kingdom use force to prevent Rhodesia from declaring unilateral independence.
 Colonel Christophe Soglo stages a second coup in Dahomey.
 October 25 – The Soviet Union declares its support of African countries in case Rhodesia unilaterally declares independence.
 October 27
 Brazilian president Humberto de Alencar Castelo Branco removes power from parliament, legal courts and opposition parties.
 Süleyman Demirel of AP forms the new government of Turkey (30th government).
 October 28 – Pope Paul VI promulgates Nostra aetate, a "Declaration on the Relation of the (Roman Catholic) Church with Non-Christian Religions" by the Second Vatican Council which includes a statement that Jews are not collectively responsible for the death of Jesus (Jewish deicide).
 October 29 – An 80-kiloton nuclear device is detonated at Amchitka Island, Alaska, as part of the Vela Uniform program, code-named Project Long Shot.
 October 30 – Vietnam War: Near Da Nang, United States Marines repel an intense attack by Viet Cong forces, killing 56 guerrillas. A sketch of Marine positions is found on the dead body of a 13-year-old Vietnamese boy who sold drinks to the Marines the day before.

November–December

 November 1 – A trolleybus plunges into the Nile at Cairo, Egypt, killing 74 passengers.
 November 3 – French President Charles de Gaulle announces (just short of his 75th birthday) that he will stand for re-election.
 November 5 – Martial law is announced in Rhodesia. The United Nations General Assembly accepts British intent to use force against Rhodesia if necessary by a vote of 82–9.
 November 6 – Freedom Flights begin: Cuba and the United States formally agree to start an airlift for Cubans who want to go to the United States (by 1971, 250,000 Cubans take advantage of this program).
 November 8
 Vietnam War – Operation Hump: The United States Army 173rd Airborne is ambushed by over 1,200 Viet Cong.
 November 11
 In Rhodesia (modern-day Zimbabwe), the white-minority government of Ian Smith unilaterally declares de facto independence ('UDI').
 United Airlines Flight 227 crashes short of the runway and catches fire at Salt Lake City International Airport, killing 43 out of 91 passengers and crew.
 November 12 – A UN Security Council resolution (voted 10–0) recommends that other countries not recognize independent Rhodesia.
 November 13
 British theatre critic Kenneth Tynan says "fuck" during a discussion on BBC satirical programme BBC-3 for what many believed was the first time on British television. The corporation later issues a public apology.
 November 14 – Vietnam War – Battle of Ia Drang: In the Ia Drang Valley of the Central Highlands in Vietnam, the first major engagement of the war between regular United States and North Vietnamese forces begins.
 November 16 – Venera program: The Soviet Union launches the Venera 3 space probe from Baikonur, Kazakhstan toward Venus (on March 1, 1966, it becomes the first spacecraft to reach the surface of another planet).
 November 20 – The United Nations Security Council recommends that all states stop trading with Rhodesia.
 November 22 – The United Nations Development Programme (UNDP) is established as a specialized agency of the United Nations.
 November 23 – Soviet general Mikhail Kazakov assumes command of the Warsaw Pact.
 November 24 – Congolese lieutenant general Mobutu ousts Joseph Kasavubu and declares himself president.
 November 26 – At the Hammaguir launch facility in the Sahara Desert, France launches a Diamant A rocket with its first satellite, Astérix-1 on board, becoming the third country to enter outer space.
 November 27
 Tens of thousands of Vietnam War protesters picket the White House, then march on the Washington Monument.
 Vietnam War: The Pentagon tells U.S. President Lyndon B. Johnson that if planned major sweep operations to neutralize Viet Cong forces during the next year are to succeed, the number of American troops in Vietnam will have to be increased from 120,000 to 400,000.
 November 28 – Vietnam War: In response to U.S. President Lyndon B. Johnson's call for "more flags" in Vietnam, Philippines President-elect Ferdinand Marcos announces he will send troops to help fight in South Vietnam.
 November 29 – The Canadian satellite Alouette 2 is launched.

 December 5
 Charles de Gaulle is re-elected as French president with 10,828,421 votes.
 The "Glasnost Meeting" in Moscow becomes the first spontaneous political demonstration, and the first demonstration for civil rights in the Soviet Union.
 December 8
 Rhodesian prime minister Ian Smith warns that Rhodesia will resist a trade embargo by neighboring countries with force.
 The Race Relations Act becomes the first legislation to address racial discrimination in the UK.
 The Second Vatican Council closes.
 December 15
 The Caribbean Free Trade Association (CARIFTA) is formed.
 Gemini 6 and Gemini 7 perform the first controlled rendezvous in Earth orbit.
 December 20 – The World Food Programme is made a permanent agency of the United Nations.
 December 21
 The Soviet Union announces that it has shipped rockets to North Vietnam.
 In West Germany, Konrad Adenauer resigns as chairman of the Christian Democratic Party.
 The United Nations adopts the International Convention on the Elimination of All Forms of Racial Discrimination.
 A new 1-hour German-American production of the ballet The Nutcracker, with an international cast that includes Edward Villella in the title role, makes its U.S. television debut. It is repeated annually by CBS over the next 3 years but after that is virtually forgotten until issued on DVD in 2009 by Warner Archive.
 December 22
 A military coup is launched in Dahomey.
 A  speed limit is imposed on British roads.
 David Lean's film of Doctor Zhivago, starring Omar Sharif and Julie Christie, is released.
 December 25 – The Yemeni Nasserist Unionist People's Organisation is founded in Ta'izz.
 December 30
 President Kenneth Kaunda of Zambia announces that Zambia and the United Kingdom have agreed on a deadline before which the Rhodesian white government should be ousted.
 Ferdinand Marcos becomes President of the Philippines.
 December 31 – Bokassa takes power in the Central African Republic.

Date unknown
 Tokyo officially becomes the largest city of the world, taking the lead from New York City.
 Aborigines are given the vote in Queensland, Australia.

World population

Births

January

 January 4
 Julia Ormond, British actress
 Yvan Attal, Israeli-born French actor and director 
 January 5
 Vinnie Jones, British footballer-turned-actor
 Patrik Sjöberg, Swedish high jumper 
 January 9 
 Haddaway, German singer
 Farah Khan, Indian choreographer, film director 
 Joely Richardson, British actress
 January 10 – Butch Hartman, American animator and voice actor
 January 12
 Nikolai Borschevsky, Russian ice hockey player 
 Maybrit Illner, German television journalist and presenter
 Rob Zombie, American musician
 January 13 – Bill Bailey, British comedian, musician and actor
 January 14
 Shamil Basayev, Chechen terrorist (d. 2006)
 Marc Delissen, Dutch field hockey player
 Bob Essensa, Canadian ice hockey player
 January 15
 Adam Jones, American musician, guitarist of metal band Tool
 James Nesbitt, Northern Irish actor
 January 20 – Sophie, Duchess of Edinburgh, wife of Prince Edward, Duke of Edinburgh
 January 21 – Jam Master Jay, American DJ, rapper and producer (d. 2002)
 January 22
 DJ Jazzy Jeff, American disc jockey
 Diane Lane, American actress
 January 23 – Catherine Guillouard, French businesswoman
 January 24 – Porfirio Fisac, Spanish basketball coach 
 January 25
 Esa Tikkanen, Finnish ice hockey player
 Natalia Yurchenko, Soviet artistic gymnast 
 January 26 – Natalia Yurchenko, Soviet artistic gymnast
 January 27
 Alan Cumming, Scottish actor
 Ignacio Noé, Argentine artist
 January 29
 Dominik Hašek, Czech hockey player
 Jo Min-su, South Korean actress

February

 

 February 1
 Dave Callaghan, South African cricketer
 Brandon Lee, Chinese-American actor (d. 1993)
 Sherilyn Fenn, American actress
 Princess Stéphanie of Monaco
 February 3 – Maura Tierney, American actress
 February 5 – Gheorghe Hagi, Romanian footballer, manager and club owner
 February 6
 Idania Martínez Grandales, Cuban broadcaster, journalist and professor
 Jan Svěrák, Czech actor, director, and screenwriter
 February 7 – Chris Rock, African-American actor, comedian, and film director
 February 8 – Dicky Cheung, Hong Kong actor
 February 9 – Keith Wickham, British actor
 February 11 – Roberto Moya, Cuban athlete (d. 2020)
 February 12 – Brett Kavanaugh, American attorney and Supreme Court Justice
 February 15 – Héctor Beltrán Leyva, Mexican drug lord (d. 2018)
 February 16 – Adama Barrow, Gambian politician, 3rd President of Gambia
 February 17 – Michael Bay, American film director
 February 18 – Dr. Dre, African-American rapper and music producer
 February 23
 Kristin Davis, American actress
 Michael Dell, American computer manufacturer
 Vincent Chalvon-Demersay, French producer
 Helena Suková, Czech tennis player
 February 25 – Sylvie Guillem, French ballerina
 February 27 – Claudia Zobel, Filipina actress (d. 1984)
 February 28 – Park Gok-ji, South Korean film editor

March

 March 1
 Mike Dean, Record producer
 Stewart Elliott, Canadian jockey
 Jack Tu, Taiwanese-Canadian cardiologist (d. 2018)
 March 2 – Ami Bera, American politician
 March 3
 Tedros Adhanom, Director of the World Health Organization
 Dragan Stojković, Serbian footballer and coach
 March 4
 Greg Alexander, Australian rugby league player
 Paul W. S. Anderson, British filmmaker, producer and screenwriter
 March 8
 Mac Jack, South African educator and politician (d. 2020)
 Caio Júnior, Brazilian football forward and manager (d. 2016) 
 March 9
Antonio Saca, 43rd President of El Salvador
Mike Pollock, American voice actor
 March 11
 Catherine Fulop, Venezuelan actress, model, beauty pageant contestant, and television presenter
 Jesse Jackson Jr., African-American politician
 Laurence Llewelyn-Bowen, British designer and television presenter
 March 14 – Aamir Khan, Indian film director, producer, film and scriptwriter and actor
 March 16
 Utut Adianto, Indonesian chess grandmaster and politician
 Mark Carney, Canadian-born economist and central banker
 March 23 – Marti Pellow, Scottish singer (Wet Wet Wet)
 March 24 
 Rob MacCachren, American racecar driver 
 The Undertaker, American professional wrestler 
 March 25
 Stefka Kostadinova, Bulgarian high jumper and president of the Bulgarian Olympic Committee
 Sarah Jessica Parker, American actress
 March 26 – Prakash Raj, Indian actor, producer and director
 March 29 – Voula Patoulidou, Greek athlete
 March 30 – Piers Morgan, British journalist and television personality
 March 31 – Patty Fendick, American tennis player

April

 April 1
 Brian Marshall, Canadian retired track and field athlete
 Bekir Bozdağ, Turkish theologian, lawyer, and politician
 April 3 – Nazia Hassan, Pakistani pop singer-songwriter, lawyer and social activist (d. 2000)
 April 4 – Robert Downey Jr., American actor, producer, and singer
 April 6
 Black Francis, American musician
 Rica Reinisch, German swimmer
 April 9 – Paulina Porizkova, Swedish-American model and actress
 April 10 – Jure Robič, Slovenian cyclist (d. 2010)
 April 11 – Eelco van Asperen, Dutch computer scientist
 April 12 – Kim Bodnia, Danish actor and director
 April 15 – Linda Perry, American musician
 April 16 – Martin Lawrence, American actor, comedian, and producer
 April 18 – Camille Coduri, English actress
 April 18 – Steven Stayner, American kidnapping victim (d. 1989)
 April 19 – Suge Knight, African-American record producer
 April 20 – Jovy Marcelo, Filipino race car driver (d. 1992)
 April 21
 Tatul Krpeyan, Armenian commander (d. 1991) 
 Julio Robaina, Republican politician, Mayor of Hialeah, Florida
 April 23 – Leni Robredo, 14th Vice President of the Philippines
 April 24 – Michel Leclerc, French director and screenwriter
 April 25 – Édouard Ferrand, French politician (d. 2018)
 April 26 – Kevin James, American comedian and actor
 April 27 – Edwin Poots, Irish politician
 April 29 – David Shafer, American politician, Georgia
 April 30 – Adrian Pasdar, Iranian-American actor and voice artist

May

 May 2 – Myriam Hernández, Chilean singer
 May 3
 Gary Mitchell, Irish playwright
 Rob Brydon, Welsh actor, comedian, impressionist and presenter
 May 7
 Owen Hart, Canadian professional wrestler (d. 1999)
 Norman Whiteside, Northern Irish football player
 May 9 – Steve Yzerman, Canadian hockey player
 May 10 – Linda Evangelista, Canadian supermodel
 May 11 – Monsour del Rosario, Filipino Olympic athlete and actor
 May 12 – Renée Simonsen, Danish model and writer
 May 13 – José Antonio Delgado, Venezuelan mountain climber (d. 2006)
 May 14 – Eoin Colfer, Irish novelist
 May 16 – Rodica Dunca, Romanian artistic gymnast
 Krist Novoselic, American musician and activist (Nirvana)
 May 17 – Trent Reznor, American rock musician (Nine Inch Nails)
 May 19 – Philippe Dhondt, French singer
 May 23 
 Manuel Sanchís Hontiyuelo, Spanish footballer
 Melissa McBride, American actress (The Walking Dead)
 May 24
 Carlos Franco, Paraguayan golfer
 John C. Reilly, American actor and comedian 
 Shinichirō Watanabe, Japanese anime director
 May 25 – Yahya Jammeh, President of the Gambia
 May 29 – Emilio Sánchez, Spanish tennis player
 May 30 – Guadalupe Grande, Spanish poet (d. 2021) 
 May 31 – Brooke Shields, American actress and model

June

 June 1
 Larisa Lazutina, Russian cross-country skier
 Nigel Short, English chess player
 June 2 – Steve and Mark Waugh, Australian cricketers
 June 4 
 Mick Doohan, Australian motorcycle racer
 Andrea Jaeger, American tennis player
 June 6
 Cam Neely, Canadian ice hockey player
 Megumi Ogata, Japanese voice actress and singer
 June 7
 Mick Foley, American professional wrestler
 Damien Hirst, British artist
 Christine Roque, French singer
 June 8
 Frank Grillo, American actor 
 Rob Pilatus, German model, dancer and singer (d. 1998)
 June 10
 Veronica Ferres, German actress
 Elizabeth Hurley, English model and actress
 June 11 – Manuel Uribe, morbidly obese Mexican (d. 2014)
 June 12 – Carlos Luis Morales, Ecuadorian journalist (d. 2020)
 June 13 – Infanta Cristina of Spain
 June 15 – Bernard Hopkins, American boxer
 June 16 – Andrea M. Ghez, American astronomer, recipient of the Nobel Prize in Physics
 June 17 
 Dana Eskelson, American actress
 Dan Jansen, American speedskater
 Dara O'Kearney, Irish ultra runner and professional poker player
 June 18
 Kim Dickens, American actress
 Hani Mohsin, Malaysian celebrity, actor and host (d. 2006) 
 June 21
 Yang Liwei, Chinese major general, military pilot and China National Space Administration astronaut
 Gabriella Selmeczi, Hungarian jurist and politician
 Tim Lajcik, Czech American mixed martial artist, stuntman, actor and writer
 June 22 – Anubhav Sinha, Indian film director
 June 23 – Paul Arthurs, English Musician (Oasis)
 June 24 – Son Hyun-joo, South Korean actor 
 June 25 – Jean Castex, French politician
 June 26 – Jana Hybášková, Czech politician and diplomat
 June 27 
 Frédéric Lemoine, French businessman
 S. Manikavasagam, Malaysian politician
 June 28 – Belayneh Dinsamo, Ethiopian long-distance runner
 June 29
 Véronique Laury, French businesswoman
 Dado Villa-Lobos, Brazilian musician
 Matthew Weiner, American television writer, director and producer
 June 30 
 Philippe Duquesne, French actor
 Cho Jae-hyun, South Korean actor
 Mitch Richmond, American basketball player

July

 July 1 
 Teddy McCarthy, hurler and Gaelic footballer 
 Carl Fogarty, English motorcycle racer
 Mohammed Abdul Hussein, Iraqi former footballer
 July 2 – Fredrik Sejersted, Norwegian jurist
 July 3
 Komsan Pohkong, Thai lawyer
 Shinya Hashimoto, Japanese professional wrestler (d. 2005)
 Connie Nielsen, Danish actress
 Tommy Flanagan, Scottish actor
 July 4 – Tracy Letts, American actor, playwright and screenwriter
 July 5 
 Kathryn Erbe, American actress
 Eyran Katsenelenbogen, Israeli jazz pianist
 July 7
 Paula Devicq, Canadian actress
 Jeremy Kyle, English radio and television presenter
 July 10
 Danny Boffin, Belgian footballer
 Princess Alexia of Greece and Denmark
 July 11 – Ernesto Hoost, Dutch kickboxer
 July 12 – Mama Kandeh, Gambian politician
 July 13 – Akina Nakamori, Japanese singer and actress
 July 14 – Lou Savarese, American boxer
 July 15 – Dafna Rechter, Israeli actress and singer
 July 17 
 Santiago Segura, Spanish actor, screenwriter, producer and director
 Rosa Gumataotao Rios, 43rd Treasurer of the United States
 Alex Winter, British actor
 July 18 – Eva Ionesco, French actress, film director and screenwriter
 July 19
 Dame Evelyn Glennie, Scottish virtuoso percussionist
 Hailemariam Desalegn, 15th Prime Minister of Ethiopia
 July 21 – Guðni Bergsson, Icelandic footballer
 July 22 – Shawn Michaels, American professional wrestler
 July 23 
 Grace Mugabe, First Lady of Zimbabwe
 Slash (Saul Hudson), American rock musician 
 July 25 – Illeana Douglas, American actress and producer
 July 26 
 Vladimir Cruz, Cuban actor
 Jeremy Piven, American actor
 Jimmy Dore, American comedian and political commentator 
 July 27
 José Luis Chilavert, Paraguayan footballer
 Trifon Ivanov, Bulgarian footballer (d. 2016)
 July 28 – Daniela Mercury, Brazilian singer, songwriter, dancer, producer, actress and television host
 July 29 – Chang-Rae Lee, Korean-American novelist
 July 31 – J. K. Rowling, English author

August

 August 1 – Sam Mendes, English film director
 August 2
 Sandra Ng, Hong Kong actress
 Hisanobu Watanabe, Japanese baseball player and coach
 August 4
 Terri Lyne Carrington, American jazz drummer
 Dennis Lehane, American crime writer
 Fredrik Reinfeldt, Swedish Prime Minister
 August 5 – Monica Ward, Italian actress and voice actress
 August 6 – David Robinson, American basketball player
 August 10
 Claudia Christian, American actress, writer, singer, musician, and director
 Mike E. Smith, American jockey
 John Starks, American basketball player
 August 11 – Viola Davis, African-American actress
 August 15 – Vincent Kok, Hong Kong director and actor
 August 16 – Michael O'Gorman, American coxswain (d. 2018)
 August 19
 Kevin Dillon, American actor
 Maria de Medeiros, Portuguese actress
 Kyra Sedgwick, American actress
 James Tomkins, Australian rower
 August 22 – David Reimer, Canadian man, born male but reassigned female and raised as a girl after a botched circumcision (d. 2004)
 August 24 – Reggie Miller, American basketball player and commentator
 August 25 – Mia Zapata, American singer (d. 1993)
 August 26 – Azela Robinson, Mexican actress
 August 28
 Satoshi Tajiri, Japanese video game designer and Pokémon creator
 Amanda Tapping, Canadian actress
 Shania Twain, Canadian country singer and songwriter
 August 31 – Daniel Bernhardt, Swiss actor and martial artist

September

 September 1 – Craig McLachlan, Australian actor and singer
 September 2 – Lennox Lewis, British boxer
 September 3
 Costas Mandylor, Greek-Australian actor
 Charlie Sheen, American actor and producer
 September 5 – Derby Makinka, Zambian footballer (d. 1993)
 September 6 – Gleisi Hoffmann, Brazilian lawyer and politician
 September 7 – Jörg Pilawa, German television presenter
 September 8
 Tutilo Burger, German Benedictine monk and abbot
 Darlene Zschech, Australian singer and worship leader
 September 10 – Marco Pastors, Dutch politician
 September 11
 Bashar al-Assad, President of Syria
 Moby, American musician
 September 12 
Einstein Kristiansen, Norwegian cartoonist, designer, and television host
Lutfur Rahman, Bangladeshi-British politician
 September 14 – Dmitry Medvedev, former President of Russia
 September 15 – Fernanda Torres, Brazilian actress
 September 16 – Katy Kurtzman, American actress, director and producer
 September 17 
 Kyle Chandler, American actor
 Yuji Naka, Japanese video game programmer
 September 19
 Goldie, English record producer and DJ
 Tim Scott, African-American politician and businessman
 Tshering Tobgay, former Prime Minister of Bhutan
 September 20 – Robert Rusler, American actor
 September 21
 Cheryl Hines, American actress
 Johanna Vuoksenmaa, Finnish film director
 David Wenham, Australian actor
 Pramila Jayapal, American politician
 September 23 – Mark Woodforde, Australian tennis player 
 September 25 – Scottie Pippen, American basketball player
 September 26 
 Radisav Ćurčić, Serbian-Israeli basketball player
 Alexei Mordashov, Russian businessman
 Petro Poroshenko, former President of Ukraine
 September 27 – Steve Kerr, American basketball player

October

 October 1 – Andreas Keller, German field hockey player
 October 2 – Gerardo Reyero, Mexican voice actor
 October 3
 Adriana Calcanhotto, Brazilian singer and composer
 Jan-Ove Waldner, Swedish table tennis player
 October 5
 Mario Lemieux, Canadian ice hockey player
 Patrick Roy, Canadian ice hockey player
 October 6 – Steve Scalise, House Majority Whip and U.S. Representative of Louisiana's 1st district
 October 8
 Matt Biondi, American swimmer
 C. J. Ramone, American musician
 October 9 – Dionicio Cerón, Mexican long-distance runner
 October 10 – Chris Penn, American actor (d. 2006)
 October 11
 Julianne McNamara, American artistic gymnast
 Lennie James, English actor, screenwriter, and playwright 
 October 13 – Kalpana, Indian film actress (d. 2016)
 October 14
 Steve Coogan, British comedian and actor
 Jüri Jaanson, Estonian rower and politician
 October 16 – Kang Kyung-ok, South Korean artist
 October 17 
 Aravinda de Silva, Sri Lankan cricketer
 Rhys Muldoon, Australian actor, writer, and director 
 October 18 – Zakir Naik, Indian doctor and Islamic activist
 October 19
 The Renegade, American professional wrestler (d. 1999)
 Ty Pennington, American television presenter
 Tracy Griffith, American actress, sushi chef, and painter
 October 20 
 Amos Mansdorf, Israeli tennis player
 Stefano Pioli, Italian football player and manager
 October 26
 Aaron Kwok, Hong Kong singer and actor
 Kelly Rowan, Canadian actress
 Kenneth Rutherford, New Zealand cricketer
 October 29 – Christy Clark, Canadian politician
 October 30 – Zaza Urushadze, Georgian film director, producer and screenwriter (d. 2019)
 October 31 – Rob Rackstraw, British actor

November

 November 2 
 Paweł Adamowicz, Polish politician and lawyer (d. 2019)
 Shah Rukh Khan, Indian actor, film/television producer and television presenter
 November 4 – Wayne Static, American singer and musician (Static-X) (d. 2014)
 November 7 – Sigrun Wodars, German athlete
 November 8 – Patricia Poleo, Venezuelan journalist
 November 9 – Sir Bryn Terfel, Welsh baritone
 November 10 – Eddie Irvine, Northern Irish racing driver
 November 11 – Max Mutchnick, American television producer
 November 12  – Ricard Zapata-Barrero, Spanish scholar of migration studies
 November 13 – Rick Roberts, Canadian actor
 November 19
 Paulo Barreto, Brazilian cryptographer
 Laurent Blanc, French football player and manager
 November 20 – Yoshiki Hayashi, Japanese rock composer, pianist and drummer 
 November 21
 Björk, Icelandic singer-songwriter and musician
 Reggie Lewis, American basketball player (d. 1993)
 Alexander Siddig, Sudanese-British actor
 November 22 – Mads Mikkelsen, Danish actor
 November 23 – Radion Gataullin, Uzbek-Russian pole-vaulter
 November 24 – Shirley Henderson, Scottish actress
 November 25 – Ana Paula Padrão, Brazilian journalist, chief editor, entrepreneur, writer and television presenter
 November 26 – Scott Adsit, American actor
 November 27 – Rachida Dati, French politician
 November 29
 Lauren Child, American author
 Yutaka Ozaki, Japanese musician (d. 1992) 
 Raffaella Reggi, Italian tennis player
 November 30
 Ben Stiller, American actor, comedian and filmmaker
 Tashi Tenzing, Indian mountaineer

December

 December 3
 Steve Harris, American actor
 Katarina Witt, German figure skater
 Andrew Stanton, American animator, storyboard artist, film director, and screenwriter
 December 5 – Johnny Rzeznik, American rock singer and guitarist 
 December 7
 Teruyuki Kagawa, Japanese actor
 Jeffrey Wright, African-American actor
 December 8 – David Harewood, English actor
 December 9 – Brad Savage, American actor
 December 10 – Stephanie Morgenstern, Canadian actress
 December 15 – Luis Fabián Artime, Argentine footballer
 December 16 – J. B. Smoove, African-American actor and comedian
 December 18 – John Moshoeu, South African footballer (d. 2015)
 December 19 – Jessica Steen, Canadian actress
 December 21 
 Andy Dick, American actor and comedian
 Anke Engelke, German comedian, actress and voice-over actress
 December 23 – Andreas Kappes, German cyclist (d. 2018)
 December 27 – Salman Khan, Indian actor, television presenter
 December 30 – Valentina Legkostupova, Soviet and Russian pop singer, teacher and producer (d. 2020)
 December 31
 Nicholas Sparks, American author
 Gong Li, Chinese actress

Date unknown
Yklymberdi Paromov, Turkmen politician

Deaths

January

 January 4 – T. S. Eliot, American-British poet, Nobel Prize laureate (b. 1888)
 January 10
 Antonín Bečvář, Czechoslovak astronomer (b. 1901)
 Frederick Fleet, British sailor and lookout aboard the RMS Titanic (b. 1887)
 January 12 – Lorraine Hansberry, African-American playwright and writer (b. 1930)
 January 14 – Jeanette MacDonald, American actress and singer (b. 1903)
 January 15 – Pierre Ngendandumwe, 4th and 6th Prime Minister of Burundi (assassinated) (b. 1930)
 January 20 – Alan Freed, American disc jockey (b. 1922)
 January 24 – Sir Winston Churchill, British politician and statesman, twice Prime Minister of the United Kingdom, World War II leader, recipient of the Nobel Prize in Literature (b. 1874)
 January 27 – Hassan Ali Mansur, Iranian politician, 69th Prime Minister of Iran (b. 1923)
 January 28
 Taimur bin Feisal, Sultan of Muscat and Oman (b. 1886)
 Maxime Weygand, French general (b. 1867)
 January 31 – Konstantin Muraviev, 31st Prime Minister of Bulgaria (b. 1893)

February

 February 5 – Irving Bacon, American actor (b. 1893)
 February 6 – Frederick, Prince of Hohenzollern (b. 1891)
 February 7 – Nance O'Neil, American stage and film actress (b. 1874)
 February 9 – Khan Bahadur Ahsanullah, Indian educationist, philosopher, philanthropist, social reformer and spiritualist (b. 1874)
 February 13 
 Humberto Delgado, Portuguese general and opposition politician (b. 1906)
 William Heard Kilpatrick, American mathematician and philosopher (b. 1871)
 February 14 – Désiré-Émile Inghelbrecht, French composer (b. 1880)
 February 15 – Nat King Cole, American singer and musician (b. 1919)
 February 19 
 Forrest Taylor, American actor (b. 1883)
 Tom Wilson, American actor (b. 1880)
 February 20 – Michał Waszyński, Polish film director and producer (b. 1904)
 February 21 – Malcolm X, American civil rights activist (b. 1925)
 February 22 – Felix Frankfurter, U.S. Supreme Court Justice (b. 1882)
 February 23 – Stan Laurel, British actor (b. 1890)
 February 24 – Takeo Itō, Japanese general (b. 1889)
 February 28 – Adolf Schärf, Austrian politician, 6th President of Austria (b. 1890)

March

 March 5 – Salvador Castaneda Castro, 31st President of El Salvador (b. 1888)
 March 6 – Margaret Dumont, American actress (b. 1889)
 March 7 – Louise Mountbatten, Queen of Sweden and second wife of King Gustaf VI Adolf (b. 1889)
 March 13
 Corrado Gini, Italian statistician (b. 1884)
 Vittorio Jano, Italian automobile designer (b. 1891)
 Fan Noli, Albanian bishop, poet and politician, 13th Prime Minister of Albania (b. 1882)
 March 14 – Marion Jones Farquhar, American tennis champion (b. 1879)
 March 17
 Nancy Cunard, English writer, heiress, and political activist (b. 1896)
 Amos Alonzo Stagg, American baseball, basketball and football player and coach (b. 1862)
 March 18 – King Farouk of Egypt (b. 1920)
 March 19 – Gheorghe Gheorghiu-Dej, Romanian communist leader, 47th Prime Minister of Romania (b. 1901)
 March 22 – Fidel Dávila, Spanish general and minister (b. 1878)
 March 23 – Mae Murray, American actress (b. 1885)
 March 25 
 Giorgio Federico Ghedini, Italian composer (b. 1892)
 Viola Liuzzo, American Unitarian Universalist and civil rights activist (b. 1925)
 March 28
 Mary, Princess Royal and Countess of Harewood (b. 1897)
 Jack Hoxie, American actor, rodeo performer (b. 1885)
 March 30 – Philip Showalter Hench, American physician, recipient of the Nobel Prize in Physiology or Medicine (b. 1896)

April

 April 3 – Ray Enright, American film director (b. 1896)
 April 10 
 Linda Darnell, American actress (b. 1923)
 La Belle Otero, Spanish actress, dancer and courtesan (b. 1868)
 April 14 
 Leonard Mudie, English actor (b. 1883)
 Perry Smith (b. 1928) and Dick Hickock (b. 1931), American convicted murderers
 April 16 – Sydney Chaplin, English actor (b. 1885)
 April 18 – Guillermo González Camarena, Mexican inventor (b. 1917)
 April 21 – Edward Victor Appleton, English physicist, Nobel Prize laureate (b. 1892)
 April 23 – George Adamski, Polish-American UFO writer (b. 1891)
 April 24 – Louise Dresser, American actress (b. 1878)
 April 27 – Edward R. Murrow, American journalist (b. 1908)
 April 30 – Helen Chandler, American actress (b. 1906)

May

 May 1 – Spike Jones, American musician and bandleader (b. 1911)
 May 6 – Oren E. Long, American politician, 10th Governor of Hawai'i (b. 1889)
 May 7 – Charles Sheeler, American photographer (b. 1883)
 May 9 – Leopold Figl, 14th Chancellor of Austria and acting President of Austria (b. 1902)
 May 14 – Frances Perkins, first woman appointed as a United States Presidential cabinet member (Labor) (b. 1880)
 May 15 – Yisrael Bar-Yehuda, Zionist activist and Israel politician (b. 1895)
 May 16 – Maria Dąbrowska, Polish writer (b. 1886)
 May 18 – Eli Cohen, Israeli spy (b. 1924)
 May 21 – Sir Geoffrey de Havilland, British aviation pioneer and aircraft company founder (b. 1882)
 May 23
 Rosina Anselmi, Italian actress (b. 1880)
 David Smith, American sculptor (b. 1906)
 May 25 – Sonny Boy Williamson, American blues musician (b. 1899)
 May 27 – John Rinehart Blue, American military officer, educator, businessperson, and politician (b. 1905)

June

 June 1 – Curly Lambeau, American football player and coach (b. 1898)
 June 5
 Eleanor Farjeon, British author of children's literature (b. 1881)
 Prince Wilhelm, Duke of Södermanland (b. 1884)
 June 7 – Judy Holliday, American actress, comedian, and singer (b. 1921)
 June 11 – José Mendes Cabeçadas, Portuguese navy officer, 94th Prime Minister of Portugal and 9th President of Portugal (b. 1883)
 June 13 – Martin Buber, Austrian-Israeli philosopher (b. 1878)
 June 15 – Steve Cochran, American actor (b. 1917)
 June 19 – James Collip, Canadian biochemist (b. 1892)
 June 20 – Bernard Baruch, American financier and presidential adviser (b. 1870)
 June 22 – David O. Selznick, American film producer (b. 1902)
 June 23 – Mary Boland, American actress (b. 1882)
 June 28 – Red Nichols, American jazz cornettist (b. 1905)
 June 30 – Bessie Barriscale, American actress (b. 1884)

July

 July 1 – Wally Hammond, English cricketer (b. 1903)
 July 7 – Moshe Sharett, 2nd Prime Minister of Israel (b. 1894)
 July 8 – T. S. Stribling, American novelist (b. 1881)
 July 11 – Ray Collins, American actor (b. 1889)
 July 13 – Laureano Gómez, 43rd President of Colombia (b. 1889)
 July 14
 Adlai Stevenson, American politician (b. 1900)
 Max Woosnam, English sportsman (b. 1892)
 July 19
 Clyde Beatty, American animal trainer (b. 1903)
 Ingrid Jonker, South African Afrikaans poet (b. 1933)
 Syngman Rhee, Korean statesman, 1st President of South Korea (b. 1875)
 July 24 – Constance Bennett, American actress (b. 1904)
 July 28 – Rampo Edogawa, Japanese author and critic (b. 1894)
 July 30 
 Pier Ruggero Piccio, Italian World War I fighter ace, air force general (b. 1880)
 Jun'ichirō Tanizaki, Japanese writer (b. 1886)

August

 August 1 – John Miller, American Olympic rower - Men's eights (b. 1903)
 August 6
 Nancy Carroll, American actress (b. 1903)
 Everett Sloane, American actor (b. 1909)
 August 8 – Shirley Jackson, American author (b. 1916)
 August 9 – Creighton Hale, American actor (b. 1882)
 August 13 – Hayato Ikeda, Japanese politician, 38th Prime Minister of Japan (b. 1899)
 August 25 – Johnny Hayes, American Olympic athlete (b. 1886)
 August 27 – Le Corbusier, Swiss architect (b. 1887)
 August 28
 Rashid Ali al-Gaylani, Iraqi politician, 9th Prime Minister of Iraq (b. 1892)
 Giulio Racah, Israeli physicist (b. 1909)
 August 29 – Paul Waner, American baseball player (b. 1903)

September

 September 4
 Tommy Hampson, British Olympic athlete (b. 1907)
 Albert Schweitzer, Alsatian physician and missionary, recipient of the Nobel Peace Prize (b. 1875)
 September 8
 Dorothy Dandridge, American actress (b. 1922)
 Hermann Staudinger, German chemist, Nobel Prize laureate (b. 1881)
 September 12 – Lucian Truscott, American general (b. 1895)
 September 16 – Fred Quimby, American animated film producer (b. 1886)
 September 17 – Alejandro Casona, Spanish poet and playwright (b. 1903)
 September 22 – Othmar Ammann, Swiss-born American engineer (b. 1879)
 September 27 – Clara Bow, American silent film actress (b. 1905)

October

 October 1 – Anton Boisen, American founder of the clinical pastoral education movement (b. 1876)
 October 3 – Zachary Scott, American actor (b. 1914)
 October 6 – Edward Evans, English murder victim (b. 1948)
 October 8 – Thomas B. Costain, Canadian author and journalist (b. 1885)
 October 11
 Dorothea Lange, American photographer (b. 1895)
 Walther Stampfli, member of the Swiss Federal Council (b. 1884)
 October 12 – Samir Al-Rifai, 6-time Prime Minister of Jordan (b. 1901)
 October 13 – Paul Hermann Müller, Swiss chemist, recipient of the Nobel Prize in Physiology or Medicine (b. 1899)
 October 14 – Randall Jarrell, American poet (b. 1914)
 October 15 – Abraham Fraenkel, Israeli mathematician and recipient of the Israel Prize (b. 1891)
 October 17 – Bart King, American cricketer (b. 1873)
 October 18
 Oscar Beregi, Hungarian actor (b. 1876)
 Henry Travers, English actor (b. 1874)
 October 21 
 Bill Black, American musician and bandleader (b. 1926)
 Marie McDonald, American actress (b. 1923)
 October 22 – Paul Tillich, German American Christian existentialist philosopher and theologian (b. 1886)
 October 23 – Luis de la Puente Uceda, Peruvian guerrilla leader (b. 1926)
 October 24 – Hans Meerwein, German chemist (b. 1879)
 October 26 – Sylvia Likens, American murder victim (b. 1949)
 October 29 – Miller Anderson, American Olympic diver (b. 1922)
 October 31 – Rita Johnson, American actress (b. 1913)

November

 November 2 
 Félix Paiva, 28th President of Paraguay (b. 1877)
 H.V. Evatt, Australian politician, judge (b. 1894)
 November 6
 Edgard Varèse, French-born composer (b. 1883)
 Clarence Williams, American musician (b. 1893)
 November 7 – Mirza Basheer-ud-Din Mahmood Ahmad, 2nd Caliph of Ahmadiyya Muslim Community in Islam (b. 1889)
 November 8 
 Dorothy Kilgallen, American newspaper columnist and television personality (b. 1913)
 Emma Gramatica, Italian actress (b. 1874)
 November 16 
 Harry Blackstone Sr., American magician and illusionist (b. 1885)
W. T. Cosgrave, Irish politician, president of the Provisional Government and the Executive Council of the Irish Free State (b. 1880)
 November 18 
 Khalid al-Azm, 5-time Prime Minister of Syria and acting President of Syria (b. 1903)
 Henry A. Wallace, 33rd Vice President of the United States (b. 1888)
 November 24 – Abdullah III Al-Salim Al-Sabah, Emir of Kuwait (b. 1895)
 November 25 – Dame Myra Hess, English pianist (b. 1890)

December

 December 5 – Joseph Erlanger, American physiologist and academic, Nobel Prize laureate (b. 1874)
 December 9 – Branch Rickey, American baseball executive (b. 1881)
 December 10 – Henry Cowell, American composer (b. 1897)
 December 11 – George Constantinescu, Romanian scientist (b. 1881)
 December 15 – Joseph Bamina, 8th Prime Minister of Burundi (executed) (b. 1925)
 December 16 
 W. Somerset Maugham, English writer (b. 1874)
 Tito Schipa, Italian tenor (b. 1889)
 December 24 – William M. Branham, American minister (b. 1909)
 December 27 – Edgar Ende, German painter (b. 1901)
 December 29 – Kosaku Yamada, Japanese composer and conductor (b. 1886)

Nobel Prizes

 Physics – Shin'ichirō Tomonaga, Julian Schwinger, Richard P. Feynman
 Chemistry – Robert Burns Woodward
 Physiology or Medicine – François Jacob, André Michel Lwoff, Jacques Monod
 Literature – Mikhail Sholokhov
 Peace – United Nation's Children's Fund (UNICEF)

References